The First Municipality (In Italian: Prima Municipalità or Municipalità 1) is one of the ten boroughs in which the Italian city of Naples is divided. It is the lesser-populated municipality.

Geography
The municipality is located by the coast in the south-western area of the city. It is extended from the western branch of the Port of Naples to the borders with Nisida (part of Bagnoli).

Its territory includes the zones of Mergellina, Piedigrotta, Borgo Santa Lucia, Borgo Marinari, Marechiaro and Rione Amedeo.

Administrative division
The First Municipality is divided into 3 quarters:

References

External links
 Municipalità 1 page on Naples website

Municipality 01